Arthur Wrottesley, 3rd Baron Wrottesley (17 June 1824 – 28 December 1910), was a British peer and Liberal politician.

Biography
Wrottesley was the son of John Wrottesley, 2nd Baron Wrottesley, President of the Royal Society, and his wife Sophia Elizabeth Giffard, daughter of Thomas Giffard. A keen cricketer, Wrottesley played a single first-class cricket match for the Marylebone Cricket Club in 1845.

He took his seat in the House of Lords on his father's death in 1867 and two years later he was appointed a Lord-in-waiting (government whip in the House of Lords) in the first Liberal administration of William Ewart Gladstone. Lord Wrottesley retained this post until the government fell in 1874, and held the same office from 1880 to 1885 in Gladstone's second administration. Apart from his political career he also served as Lord Lieutenant of Staffordshire from 1871 to 1887.

Lord Wrottesley married Hon. Augusta Elizabeth Denison, daughter of Albert Denison, 1st Baron Londesborough, in 1861. He died in December 1910, aged 86, and was succeeded in the baronetcy and barony by his eldest son Victor Alexander Wrottesley.

References 

1824 births
1910 deaths
Barons in the Peerage of the United Kingdom
Liberal Party (UK) Lords-in-Waiting
Lord-Lieutenants of Staffordshire
English cricketers
Marylebone Cricket Club cricketers